Hacking (informal for "corrupting") may mean either the attacking of systems to cause a corruption of systems (formal interpretation), or it may refer to the learning of systems through unorthodox disassembly and probing to build one's ability to be useful in the building or repair or patching of such systems (second meaning, informal or pseudo-formal).'

Technology
 Hacker, a computer expert with advanced technical knowledge
 Hacker culture,  activity within the computer programmer subculture
 Security hacker, someone who breaches defenses in a computer system 
 Cybercrime, which involves security hacking
 Phone hacking, gaining unauthorized access to phones
 ROM hacking, the process of modifying a video game's program image

Places
 Hacking, an area within Hietzing, Vienna, Austria

People
 Douglas Hewitt Hacking, 1st Baron Hacking (1884–1950), British Conservative politician
 Ian Hacking (born 1936), Canadian philosopher of science
 David Hacking, 3rd Baron Hacking (born 1938), British barrister and peer

Sports
 Hacking (falconry), the practice of raising falcons in captivity then later releasing into the wild
 Hacking (rugby), tripping an opposing player
 Pleasure riding, horseback riding for purely recreational purposes, also called hacking
 Shin-kicking, an English martial art also called hacking

Other uses
 Roof and tunnel hacking, unauthorized exploration of roof and utility tunnel spaces

See also
 Hack (disambiguation)
 Hacker (disambiguation)
 Hacks (disambiguation)
 List of hacker groups